Kole Warren Cottam (born May 30, 1997) is an American professional baseball catcher for the Frederick Atlantic League Team of the Atlantic League of Professional Baseball.

Amateur career
Cottam attended Knoxville Catholic High School in Knoxville, Tennessee, where he earned three varsity letters in baseball. During his junior season in 2014, he hit .373 with 25 RBIs. As a senior in 2015, he batted .489 with six home runs, 54 RBIs, and 18 doubles. He went unselected in the 2015 Major League Baseball draft and enrolled at the University of Kentucky where he played college baseball.

As a freshman at Kentucky in 2016, he batted .287 with one home run and 15 RBIs over forty games before hitting .319 with seven home runs and 44 RBIs over 55 games as a sophomore. During the summer of 2017, he played in the Cape Cod Baseball League with the Yarmouth-Dennis Red Sox. As a junior in 2018, he played in 56 games and batted .352 with 19 home runs, 51 RBIs, and 12 doubles. Following the season's end, he was selected by the Boston Red Sox in the fourth round with the 130th overall selection in the 2018 Major League Baseball draft. He signed with the team for $375,000.

Professional career

Boston Red Sox
Cottam split his first professional season in 2018 between the Lowell Spinners and Greenville Drive, batting .236 with three home runs and 24 RBIs over 32 games. He spent the 2019 season with Greenville and the Salem Red Sox and hit a combined .255 with eight home runs and 44 RBIs over 87 games between the teams. He did not play a game in 2020 due to the COVID-19 pandemic causing the cancellation of the minor league season. 

Cottam split the 2021 season between Greenville and the Portland Sea Dogs, slashing .278/.371/.500 with ten home runs and 33 RBIs over 71 games. He opened the 2022 season back with Portland and was promoted to the Worcester Red Sox in early August. Over 78 games between the two teams, he batted .255 with two home runs and 28 RBIs. Cottam was released by the Red Sox on March 5, 2023.

Frederick Atlantic League Team
On March 20, 2023, Cottam signed with the Frederick Atlantic League Team in the Atlantic League of Professional Baseball.

References

External links
Kentucky Wildcats bio

1997 births
Living people
Baseball catchers
Baseball players from Tennessee
Sportspeople from Knoxville, Tennessee
Yarmouth–Dennis Red Sox players
Minor league baseball players
Greenville Drive players
Lowell Spinners players
Salem Red Sox players
Portland Sea Dogs players
Worcester Red Sox players